Dio c'è is a 1998 Italian comedy film directed by Alfredo Arciero.

Cast
Riccardo Rossi as Riccardo
Chiara Noschese as Chiara
Daniele Formica as Barbone
Ivo Garrani as Ettore
Wanna Marchi as Chiara's mother
Miranda Martino as Riccardo's mother
Luigi Montini as Mangoni
Elisabetta Pezzoni as Roberta
Maurizio Santilli as Vinicio

References

External links

1998 films
1990s Italian-language films
1998 comedy films
Italian comedy films
Films directed by Alfredo Arciero
1990s Italian films